The Jordanian Premier Basketball League is a professional basketball league in Jordan. It is the top league in the country with the second-tier league going by the name of First Division. There are six teams competing in the 2022 league:  Al Ahli, Al Riyadi , Orthodox Club, Kufryouba, Jubeha, and Al Ashrafyeh.

Teams

Map

Main arenas 

The league games are played either in Prince Hamzeh Arena in Amman, or Prince Hassan Sports Center in Irbid

Clubs

Champions

Wins by club

Performance by club

References 

Asia-basket.com & Goalzz.com

Ghaleb Balawi, Jordanian Basketball History book, 2010

External links 
 Jordan Basketball Federation official website

League
Jordan